Beck is a Japanese manga series written and illustrated by Harold Sakuishi. It was originally serialized in Monthly Shōnen Magazine from 1999 to 2008, with the 103 chapters later published into 34 tankōbon volumes by Kodansha. It tells the story of a group of Japanese teenagers who form a rock band and their struggle to fame, focusing on 14-year-old Yukio "Koyuki" Tanaka, who until meeting guitar prodigy Ryusuke Minami was an average teen with a boring life.

It was adapted into a 26-episode anime television series, titled Beck: Mongolian Chop Squad, by Madhouse and aired on TV Tokyo from October 2004 to March 2005. A live-action film adaptation was released in 2010 and stars Takeru Satoh as Koyuki and Hiro Mizushima as Ryusuke. The series has also spawned three guidebooks, four soundtracks, a video game and a line of guitars.

The Beck manga was licensed for an English-language release in North America by Tokyopop. The first volume was published in July 2005, but the series was discontinued after the release of volume 12 in June 2008. In July 2018, ComiXology began releasing the series digitally. The anime was given an English-language release by Funimation from in 2007 to 2008.

Plot summary

Yukio Tanaka, known as "Koyuki" by his friends, is a regular 14-year-old Japanese boy starting eighth grade in junior high school. His boring life is changed when he saves an odd-looking dog, named Beck, from some kids. Beck's owner turns out to be an emerging rock musician, 16-year-old Ryusuke Minami, who soon influences Koyuki to start playing the guitar. The story focuses on the trials and tribulations of their rock band named Beck, and Koyuki's relationships with its members, in particular Ryusuke and his 14-year-old half-sister Maho.

After hanging out with Ryusuke and seeing him play with his former band, Koyuki slowly becomes interested in Western rock music. Ryusuke gives him a guitar, but when Koyuki breaks it, Ryusuke tells him never to speak to him again. At the same time, Ryusuke forms his new band Beck, with vocalist Tsunemi Chiba, bassist Yoshiyuki Taira, and Togo, the drummer from his previous band. Koyuki begins working for, and learning guitar from, 44-year-old Kenichi Saitou in exchange to have the guitar fixed.

He reunites with Ryusuke a year later, and begins to rehearse with Beck. Koyuki then makes friends with his classmate Yuji "Saku" Sakurai. When Togo leaves the band, Ryusuke has Koyuki and Saku join Beck as support musicians, becoming full members only when the band hears Koyuki sing. Eventually Beck releases their first album, which gets released on an independent record label in the United States, under the band name Mongolian Chop Squad. After gaining popularity from their US album and Koyuki being in an internationally screened concert documentary, Beck earns a spot at the music festival Grateful Sound 5, where they put on the most talked about show of the whole festival. (The live-action film adaptation ends here.) However, circumstances cause them to part ways, making it their last performance.

Finding life tedious without being in Beck, Koyuki slowly gets the members back together, except Ryusuke, whose whereabouts are unknown. They perform a few shows as a quartet, before getting an offer to tour the US based on their Grateful Sound 5 performance. After Koyuki and Saku drop out of school to do the tour, Beck heads to America. But after several bad performances, they are about to get kicked off the tour before reuniting with Ryusuke in Seattle. (The anime adaptation ends here.) The rest of the tour is a hit and they end up appearing on national TV before heading back to Japan.

After releasing two singles, Beck goes on a nationwide tour of Japan and earn a spot at Grateful Sound 7. However, they are later cut from the lineup. They slowly bounce back after forming a tour with several similar-sounding bands, get signed to a popular British indie record label, and start recording their first full album. The now-famous director who created the concert documentary Koyuki once appeared in ends up directing their first music video. Their album and music video do well both in Japan and England, earning them numerous magazine articles in both countries. After another nationwide tour of Japan, they do a short tour of England, including a spot at the relaunch of the legendary Avalon Festival. The band then signs to a major international record label and records their major debut album in New York. With the album hugely successful worldwide, they tour Japan and America extensively, and the series then ends with Beck headlining the main stage at Grateful Sound 9.

Characters

 The main character; the series follows his rapid development from living a boring average life to becoming an outstanding guitarist and singer. Before meeting Ryusuke, he only listened to Japanese pop music, having never heard a foreign band before. He is the last member recruited into Beck (along with Saku), playing rhythm guitar and singing slower songs. Koyuki is voiced by Daisuke Namikawa in the Japanese anime, with Kazuya Hirabayashi providing his singing voice, and by Greg Ayres in the English dub. He is portrayed by Takeru Satoh in the live-action film.

 A slacker, but incredibly talented guitarist, who inspires Koyuki to pick up the instrument. Ryusuke speaks better English than Japanese, having lived in New York for eight years. He is the lead guitarist of Beck as well as its founding member. A large amount of the story revolves around him and his bullet-hole ridden Gibson Les Paul guitar, named Lucille (which is the same name as B.B. King's famous black Gibson). Ryusuke is voiced by Yuuma Ueno in the Japanese anime and by Eric Vale in the English dub. He is portrayed by Hiro Mizushima in the live-action film.

 Maho is Ryusuke's younger half-sister and a talented singer. She is brash but emotionally fragile, and gradually builds a romantic relationship with Koyuki. Beautiful and fairly popular, Koyuki often has a hard time approaching her romantically. While she is obviously a gifted singer, Maho confides in Koyuki that she would actually like to be a film maker. She is also an amateur model. Maho is voiced by Miho Saiki in the Japanese anime, with Sowelu providing her singing voice, and by Brina Palencia in the English dub. She is portrayed by Shioli Kutsuna in the live-action film.

 The main vocalist of Beck, Chiba's vocals are more punk and rap-oriented than Koyuki's and thus more fitting for the majority of Beck's songs. He is easily the most volatile member of Beck, never shying away from a fight or hiding his feelings during dire situations. He is also very good at karate, which he uses in his performances. He originally took up karate because he was bullied severely in his younger days. When not busy with the band, he helps manage his family's ramen shop; he says that if Beck doesn't work out, he would open up a chain of ramen shops. Towards the end of the series, Ryusuke tells him that he should leave the band because he thinks he is not as passionate about music as the rest of the band. He complies, but quickly returns to play with the band. His appearance is based on Rage Against the Machine frontman Zack de la Rocha. He is voiced by Shintaro Ohata in the Japanese anime, with Tatsuzo of YKZ providing his singing voice, and by Justin Cook in the English dub. He is portrayed by Kenta Kiritani in the live-action film.

 Beck's bassist, Taira is the second member recruited by Ryusuke. Although he can sometimes seem uncaring or apathetic, he is actually the most mature of the band members and often offers helpful advice. He usually performs shirtless, much like the real-life person he is based on: Flea of the Red Hot Chili Peppers. His main live bass is a white Music Man Stingray (a 1993-1996 model as identified from the type of bridge) with 3-band EQ and a trans bridge. Taira is voiced by Kenji Nojima in the Japanese anime and by Jerry Jewell in the English dub. He is portrayed by Osamu Mukai in the live-action film.

 Saitou is a perverted middle-aged man and former Olympic swimmer who teaches Koyuki both guitar and swimming in exchange for Koyuki working for his business. Though he can be a demanding instructor, he opens up to Koyuki, even asking him for relationship advice on occasion. Saitou is voiced by Porsche Okite in the Japanese anime and by R Bruce Elliott in the English dub. He is portrayed by Takanori Takeyama in the live-action film.

 Saku is Beck's drummer and the last member to join (along with Koyuki). He first becomes good friends with Koyuki at school, being the only person to talk to him while bully Hyodo instigated the entire class not to do so. He is closer to Koyuki than the other members of the band, and Koyuki often confides in him during moments of self-doubt. Towards the end of the series, he moves away to attend high school, but promises that he will return on the condition that Beck reunites. As Koyuki does reform Beck, he returns, telling the band that he essentially ran away from home to do so. He is voiced by Tōru Nara in the Japanese anime and by Johnny Yong Bosch in the English dub. He is portrayed by Aoi Nakamura in the live-action film.

Media

Manga

The original manga was written and illustrated by Harold Sakuishi and published by Kodansha in its shōnen manga magazine Monthly Shōnen Magazine from 1999 to its May 2008 issue (which was released on April 5). A special 77-page side-story was published in the October 2008 issue of Monthly Shōnen Magazine. It depicts the last day of Eddie Lee, a popular American rock musician and Ryusuke's friend. The 103 chapters (including the Eddie Lee special) were combined into 34 tankōbon volumes.

The manga was licensed for an English-language release by Tokyopop. Tokyopop's German branch published the German-language version. In January 2009, it was announced that Kodansha let all of Tokyopop's German licenses expire, thus including Beck. This subsequently led to Tokyopop's English license of Beck expiring as well. Only 12 volumes were published. In 2018, ComiXology began releasing the series digitally. They released the first fourteen volumes simultaneously on July 5. The series has also been released in French, Italian, Korean and Chinese, by Delcourt/Akata, Dynit, Haksan Culture Company and Tong Li Publishing respectively.

Anime

The 26-episode anime television series was titled Beck: Mongolian Chop Squad, after the subtitle used by the band in the series in the United States, and aired on Japan's TV Tokyo from October 2004 to March 2005. It was directed by Osamu Kobayashi, animated by Madhouse and produced by Takeshi Shukuri and Yoshimi Nakajima.

The anime has been dubbed and broadcast on TV networks in North America, France, Italy, Philippines and Thailand.

English adaptation
On Saturday, May 27 at Anime Boston 2006, U.S.-based anime distributor FUNimation Entertainment announced that they had acquired the license for the Beck: Mongolian Chop Squad anime. Taliesin Jaffe (known for directing the dub of Hellsing) and Christopher Bevins (known for directing the dubs of Speed Grapher and Samurai 7) are the directors of the English version. The first DVD was released in 2007, and the last in January 2008. The English dub was released by Revelation Films in the UK and Madman Entertainment in Australia and New Zealand.

Beck made its North American television debut on the Canadian music channel, MuchMusic, on March 9, 2007. The series finished on June 3. Despite the fact that this is a shōnen series, the show was rated TV-14 for its language and violence, but the DVD edition is rated TV-MA for strong language, including near-constant use of the word fuck in the first episode and frequently in subsequent episodes. In September 2013, MuchMusic pulled the series and replaced it with Odd Job Jack.

In the English adaptation, many songs were re-recorded with English lyrics. The sung lyrics of some English songs in the anime, such as "Moon on the Water" and "Follow Me", were slightly altered to correct grammar, although the incorrect grammar still appears in the English subtitles. The Beatles' song "I've Got a Feeling" has the lyrics replaced in the American DVDs.

Live-action film

A live-action film adaptation of the Beck manga was announced in 2009, with filming beginning in July. It was produced and directed by Yukihiko Tsutsumi, who has directed manga-to-film adaptations in the past (most notably the 20th Century Boys trilogy). It stars Takeru Satoh as Koyuki, Hiro Mizushima as Ryusuke, Kenta Kiritani as Chiba, Aoi Nakamura as Saku and Osamu Mukai as Taira. The actors were given proper training on their instruments for the 30 original songs that were written for the film.

Beck was released nationwide in movie theaters on September 4, 2010. Red Hot Chili Peppers and Oasis provide the opening and ending theme songs, "Around the World" and "Don't Look Back in Anger" respectively.

Grand Funk Inc. was given the Japan Academy Prize for Outstanding Achievement in Music for its music work in the film. The movie was released on DVD and Blu-ray on February 2, 2011. The DVD came in "standard" and "luxury" editions, with the luxury edition including a bonus DVD.

Soundtracks

In 2002, the manga received a tribute album featuring several different artists. The songs used in the anime that were performed by the character's voice actors with Beat Crusaders were released on a soundtrack in 2002. That same day an album featuring those same songs, but in their original versions, was released. A soundtrack to the live-action movie was released in 2010.

Other media
Action figures of each band member were created, equipped with amplifiers, interchangeable guitars and in the case of Saku, an elaborate drum kit.

On March 31, 2005, Marvelous Interactive released an adventure video game for the PlayStation 2 based on the series, titled Beck: The Game.

Fender Japan produced two signature Beck guitars. A Fender Telecaster, and a Fender Mustang which were both played by Koyuki. The signature is written on the back of the guitars' headstock.

Reception
Manga
The series won the 2002 Kodansha Manga Award in the shōnen category. In Japan, it has sold 12 million copies as of April 2008.

Anime

References

External links
Official site 
TV Tokyo's official site of the anime 
ComiXology's official site for the manga
Funimation's official site for the anime 

1999 manga
2004 anime television series debuts
Animated television series about dogs
Coming-of-age anime and manga
Funimation
Kodansha manga
Madhouse (company)
Manga adapted into films
Much (TV channel) original programming
Music in anime and manga
Romance anime and manga
Shōnen manga
Tokyopop titles
TV Tokyo original programming
Winner of Kodansha Manga Award (Shōnen)
Japanese romance films